The 2020 Dubai 24 Hour was the 15th running of the Dubai 24 Hour. It was also the first round of both the 2020 24H GT Series and the 2020 24H TCE Series. The event was held on 9 to 10 January at the Dubai Autodrome, United Arab Emirates.  The race ran for 7 hours, 18 minutes of race time and 16 hours overall before the race was red flagged due to excess rain. The track had insufficient draining for the amount of rain and after 16 hours officials declared the race official.

Result

References

Dubai 24 Hour
Dubai 24 Hour
Dubai 24 Hour
2020 in 24H Series